Mbeki is a surname of South African and Xhosa origin. Notable people with the surname include:

Mbeki family 
 Govan Mbeki, the father of Thabo Mbeki, politician, military commander, Communist leader
 Epainette Mbeki, the mother of Thabo Mbeki, known as "MaMbeki", a stalwart community activist and promoter of women's development
 Thabo Mbeki, former President of South Africa
 Zanele Mbeki (née Dlamini), wife of Thabo Mbeki, a feminist South African social worker who founded the Women's Development Bank
Monwabisi Kwanda Mpahlwa, son of Thabo Mbeki and his high school sweetheart, Olive Mphahlwa
 Moeletsi Mbeki, son of Govan and brother of Thabo, deputy chairman of the South African Institute of International Affairs

Xhosa-language surnames